Shaver Lake (formerly, Musick Creek and Musick Creek Heights) is a census-designated place (CDP) in Fresno County, California, United States. The population was 634 at the 2010 census, down from 705 at the 2000 census. The name honors C.B. Shaver, founder of the Fresno Flume and Irrigation Company that built the dam, creating the lake. The lake served as a mill pond for the Shaver Sawmill and the source for a flume that ran  to Clovis. The original town of Shaver was buried under the lake when the Thomas A. Edison Company purchased and enlarged the lake in 1919.

Geography

Demographics

2010
The 2010 United States Census reported that Shaver Lake had a population of 634. The population density was 18.4 people per square mile (7.1/km). The racial makeup of Shaver Lake was 611 (96.4%) White, 0 (0.0%) African American, 5 (0.8%) Native American, 3 (0.5%) Asian, 0 (0.0%) Pacific Islander, 8 (1.3%) from other races, and 7 (1.1%) from two or more races.  Hispanic or Latino of any race were 44 persons (6.9%).

The Census reported that 634 people (100% of the population) lived in households, 0 (0%) lived in non-institutionalized group quarters, and 0 (0%) were institutionalized.

There were 292 households, out of which 54 (18.5%) had children under the age of 18 living in them, 184 (63.0%) were opposite-sex married couples living together, 11 (3.8%) had a female householder with no husband present, 11 (3.8%) had a male householder with no wife present.  There were 10 (3.4%) unmarried opposite-sex partnerships, and 3 (1.0%) same-sex married couples or partnerships. 72 households (24.7%) were made up of individuals, and 28 (9.6%) had someone living alone who was 65 years of age or older. The average household size was 2.17.  There were 206 families (70.5% of all households); the average family size was 2.54.

The population was spread out, with 93 people (14.7%) under the age of 18, 34 people (5.4%) aged 18 to 24, 88 people (13.9%) aged 25 to 44, 266 people (42.0%) aged 45 to 64, and 153 people (24.1%) who were 65 years of age or older.  The median age was 54.3 years. For every 100 females, there were 110.6 males.  For every 100 females age 18 and over, there were 108.1 males.

The homeowner vacancy rate was 12.0%; the rental vacancy rate was 39.3%.  511 people (80.6% of the population) lived in owner-occupied housing units and 123 people (19.4%) lived in rental housing units.

2000
As of the census of 2000, there were 705 people, 303 households, and 229 families residing in the CDP. The population density was 21.8 people per square mile (8.4/km). The racial makeup of the CDP was 97.16% White, 0.43% Native American, 0.28% Asian, 1.42% from other races, and 0.71% from two or more races. 6.52% of the population were Hispanic or Latino of any race.

There were 303 households, out of which 23.4% had children under the age of 18 living with them, 70.0% were married couples living together, 2.0% had a female householder with no husband present, and 24.4% were non-families. 20.1% of all households were made up of individuals, and 7.6% had someone living alone who was 65 years of age or older. The average household size was 2.33 and the average family size was 2.64.

In the CDP, the population was spread out, with 18.7% under the age of 18, 3.0% from 18 to 24, 20.1% from 25 to 44, 40.7% from 45 to 64, and 17.4% who were 65 years of age or older. The median age was 49 years. For every 100 females, there were 104.9 males. For every 100 females age 18 and over, there were 105.4 males.

The median income for a household in the CDP was $42,250, and the median income for a family was $51,250. Males had a median income of $40,956 versus $32,019 for females. The per capita income for the CDP was $24,695. About 10.3% of families and 10.3% of the population were below the poverty line, including 13.4% of those under age 18 and 5.7% of those age 65 or over.

See also
Shaver Lake
Shaver Lake Heights, California
Shaver Lake Railroad
Burrough Valley
Tollhouse, California

References

Census-designated places in Fresno County, California
Census-designated places in California